The coat of arms of Oldenburg is the coat of arms associated with the state of Oldenburg, a county, duchy and then grand duchy that existed between 1101 and 1918. The arms are also associated with the parts of the House of Oldenburg that ruled the state. 

The coat of arms recognised the full acquisitions of the state in those years. Various branches used assorted minor arms; those most associated with the Oldenburg part of the state were copies of the flags of Oldenburg. The inescutcheon was used on the state ensign of 1893 to 1918/1921.

Design
The main shield shows the arms of:
Kingdom of Norway (top-left);
Duchy of Schleswig (top-right);
Duchy of Holstein (middle-left);
Territory of Stormarn (middle-right);
Territory of Dithmarschen (bottom-left);
Lordship of Kniphausen (bottom-right).

The inescutcheon shows the arms of:
County of Oldenburg (family arms, top-left);
County of Delmenhorst (family arms, top-right);
Prince-Bishopric of Lübeck (principality of Eutin, bottom-left);
Principality of Birkenfeld (bottom-right);
Lordship of Jever (bottom-middle);

References

Oldenburg
Oldenburg (state)
Oldenburg
Oldenburg
Oldenburg
Oldenburg
Oldenburg
Oldenburg